Wallace James Hood Jr. (September 24, 1925 – June 16, 2001) was an American professional baseball pitcher whop appeared in two games in Major League Baseball for the New York Yankees in . His father, Wally Sr., a standout outfielder in the Pacific Coast League, played in 67 MLB games during the early 1920s.

In two years of varsity baseball, he posted a 29–4 won–lost record, including a 21–2 mark in 1948. In 2019, Hood was inducted into the National College Baseball Hall of Fame.

Hood signed with the Yankees in 1948, and in his second pro season received his MLB audition in September 1949. He made two appearances in relief, compiling a 0–0 record with a 0.00 earned run average with no saves. In 2 innings pitched, he did not permit a hit and recorded two strikeouts, with one base on balls.

See also
List of second-generation Major League Baseball players

References

External links

1925 births
2001 deaths
All-American college baseball players
Baseball players from Los Angeles
Fairfax High School (Los Angeles) alumni
Fort Worth Cats players
Hollywood Stars players
Kansas City Blues (baseball) players
Newark Bears (IL) players
Major League Baseball pitchers
Mobile Bears players
Montreal Royals players
National College Baseball Hall of Fame inductees
New York Yankees players
San Francisco Seals (baseball) players
USC Trojans baseball players